Cage-Mazumbo  is a town and commune in the municipality of Nambuangongo, Bengo Province, Angola.

References

Populated places in Bengo Province
Communes in Bengo Province